Gong Maoxin (born August 24, 1987), is a professional male tennis player.

Challenger and Futures finals

Singles: 11 (5–6)

Doubles: 73 (42–31)

Davis Cup

Singles performances (2–2)

Doubles performances (7–9)

References

External links 

1987 births
Living people
Chinese male tennis players
Sportspeople from Nanjing
Tennis players at the 2010 Asian Games
Tennis players at the 2014 Asian Games
Tennis players at the 2018 Asian Games
Asian Games medalists in tennis
Asian Games silver medalists for China
Medalists at the 2010 Asian Games
Medalists at the 2014 Asian Games
Tennis players from Jiangsu
21st-century Chinese people